Newport School District may refer to:
 Newport School District (Arkansas)
 Newport School District (Pennsylvania)
 Newport School District (Washington)
 Newport Public Schools in Rhode Island